Josiah Gilbert Holland (July 24, 1819 – October 12, 1881) was an American novelist and poet who also wrote under the pseudonym Timothy Titcomb.  He helped to found and edit Scribner's Monthly (afterwards the Century Magazine), in which appeared his novels, Arthur Bonnicastle, The Story of Sevenoaks, Nicholas Minturn. In poetry he wrote "Bitter-Sweet" (1858), "Kathrina", the lyrics to the Methodist hymn "There's a Song in the Air", and many others.

Biography
Born in Belchertown, Massachusetts, on July 24, 1819, Holland grew up in a poor family struggling to make ends meet. He spent only a few years at the low-slung family farmhouse at Dwight and later quipped that he’d like to “burn it to the ground.”. The youngest of six children, his parents were deeply religious, from pious Puritan stock. 

His father was a “migratory ne'er-do-well,” a failed inventor, moving the family every year or two: Heath, back to Belchertown, South Hadley, Granby and Northampton. 

After time, Josiah was forced to work in a factory to help the family. He then spent a short time studying at Northampton (Massachusetts) High School before withdrawing due to ill health. Later he studied medicine at Berkshire Medical College, where he took a degree in 1844.

Hoping to become a successful physician, he began a medical practice with classmate Dr. Bailey in Springfield, Massachusetts. While trying to establish the practice, he wrote for periodicals such as Knickerbocker Magazine and even tried to publish a newspaper, The Bay State Weekly Courier, but the attempt proved unsuccessful, as did his medical practice. In 1845 he married Elizabeth Luna Chapin. After giving up medicine in 1848, he left western Massachusetts and took a teaching position in Richmond, Virginia, followed by one in 1849 in Vicksburg, Mississippi.

In 1850 Holland returned to western Massachusetts and became an editor of the Springfield Republican newspaper, working with the well known editor Samuel Bowles. Many of the essays Holland wrote for the paper in the decade before the Civil War were collected and published in book form, which helped to establish his literary reputation.

His first book was a History of Western Massachusetts. He followed in 1857 with an historical novel, Bay Path, and a collection of essays titled Titcomb's Letters to Young People, Single and Married in 1858. In 1862, when Samuel Bowles took an extended trip to Europe, Holland temporarily assumed the duties as editor-in-chief of the Springfield Republican. After the Civil War he reduced his editorial duties and wrote many of his most popular works, including the Life of Abraham Lincoln (1866), and Kathrina (1867).

Holland wrote an eloquent eulogy of Abraham Lincoln within days of Lincoln's death, prompting a commission for a full biography of the late president. He quickly pulled together the lengthy Life of Abraham Lincoln, finished in February 1866, which portrayed Lincoln as an emancipator opposed to slavery. Although Holland wrote using "on-the-ground investigation," later historians noted that as a journalist with a deadline, the work had "the signs of hurry." His work also spurred Lincoln's law partner William Herndon to commence his own research and biography. Herndon was happy to help Holland but took issue with a tangential quote attributed to Lincoln in the work describing God's role in emancipation; Herndon believed Lincoln "had no religion more intense than a bland deism."

In 1868 Holland traveled to Europe, and while there he met Roswell Smith. Together they developed the idea of starting a magazine. When they returned to the United States in 1869, the two men collaborated with Charles Scribner to publish Scribner's Monthly. The first issue was published in 1870 with Holland as editor.

These years in New York were also productive for his own literary efforts. During the 1870s he published three novels: Arthur Bonicastle (1873), Sevenoaks (1875), and Nicholas Minturn (1877). His poetry volumes included The Marble Prophecy (1872), The Mistress and the Manse (1874), and The Puritan's Guest (1881).

Holland died on October 12, 1881, at the age of 62, in New York City. Holland is buried in Springfield Cemetery in Springfield, Massachusetts.  His gravestone includes a bas-relief portrait sculpted by the eminent American 19th-century sculptor, Augustus Saint-Gaudens, and includes the Latin inscription "Et vitam impendere vero" meaning "to devote life to truth".

Legacy
Although his literary products are rarely read today, during the late nineteenth century they were enormously popular, and more than half a million volumes of Holland's writings were sold. He is also remembered today for his contributions as an editor. Holland and his wife were frequent correspondents and family friends of poet Emily Dickinson.

References

External links 

 
 
 
 
 Holland Collection of Literary Letters, University of Colorado Boulder
 Titcomb’s Letters to Young People, Single and Married

19th-century American novelists
American male novelists
American magazine editors
Novelists from Massachusetts
1819 births
1881 deaths
East Texas Baptist University alumni
Massachusetts Republicans
American male poets
19th-century American poets
19th-century American journalists
American male journalists
Berkshire Medical College alumni
19th-century American male writers
Historians of Abraham Lincoln
People from Springfield, Massachusetts
American male biographers